Rolf Klementsen (28 March 1913 – 5 February 1983) was a Norwegian sports shooter. He competed in the 50 m pistol event at the 1952 Summer Olympics.

References

1913 births
1983 deaths
Norwegian male sport shooters
Olympic shooters of Norway
Shooters at the 1952 Summer Olympics
Sportspeople from Oslo